Morello is a surname. Notable people with the surname include:

 Andrea Morello (born 1972), Australian physicist
 Celeste Anne Morello, American historian and criminologist
 Dario Morello (born 1968), Italian footballer
 Davide Morello (born 1978), Italian footballer
 Enrico Morello (born 1977), Italian footballer
 Giuseppe Morello (1867–1930), mobster
 Giuseppe Morello (footballer) (born 1985), Swiss-Italian
 Joe Morello (1928–2011), jazz drummer
 Josephine A. Morello, criminologist
 Lorna Morello, fictional character
 Martín Morello (born 1983), Argentine footballer
 Mary Morello (born 1923)
 Nicholas Morello (1890–1916), mobster
 Ricardo Morello (born 1943), Argentine swimmer
 Steven J. Morello, American lawyer
 Tom Morello (born 1964), guitarist

See also
 Morella (disambiguation)
 Morello crime family, Sicilian founders of the US mafia

Italian-language surnames